K-32, also known as the Kaw Valley Scenic Highway, is an approximately  east–west state highway in the Kansas City metropolitan area of Kansas. K-32's western terminus is just outside Lawrence at U.S. Route 24 (US-24) and US-40. Its eastern terminus is at US-69, also known as the 18th Street Expressway, in Kansas City. Along the way it intersects several major highways, including K-7 in Bonner Springs as well as Interstate 435 (I-435) and I-635 in Kansas City. In Kansas City, K-32 follows the Turner Diagonal from Kaw Drive to Kansas Avenue. From its western terminus to Bonner Springs, the highway is a two-lane rural highway; the remaining section is a four-lane highway that runs through residential areas.

K-32 was first established as a state highway in 1927. At that time, the highway ran from US-40 northeast of Lawrence to the Missouri border in Kansas City. By 1937, K-32 was realigned off of Kansas Avenue to follow Muncie Bluff Road and Central Avenue through Kansas City. In the early 1950s, the highway was built on a new alignment to the east and west of Linwood. In the late-1960s, K-32 was upgraded to a four-lane highway between Bonner Springs and Kansas City. In the early-1990s, K-132 was decommissioned, at which time K-32 was realigned onto the former section from K-32 eastward. K-32's alignment has not changed since the latter realignment.

Route description

K-32's western terminus is at U.S. Route 24 (US-24) and US-40 in extreme northeastern Douglas County, northeast of Lawrence. From this intersection, K-32 heads east along Linwood Road and quickly enters Leavenworth County. The highway crosses over Interstate 70 (I-70) and the Kansas Turnpike; however, there is no connection. The roadway proceeds east to Golden Road, where the highway shifts north slightly as it crosses Kent Creek. K-32 continues to an intersection with County Route 1, which connects K-32 with I-70 and the Kansas Turnpike. The roadway continues east and soon enters the northern part of Linwood. The highway exits the city and crosses over Stranger Creek then curves northeast and passes Saroxie Lake. K-32 continues to Hemphill Road, where it curves east, then intersects 170th Street. The highway crosses Little Kaw Creek then intersects North 158th Street south of Basehor.

K-32 crosses into Wyandotte County as it enters Bonner Springs as Kump Avenue. The highway crosses Wolf Creek then intersects K-32 Truck (Scheidt Lane). The roadway curves south then intersects the eastern terminus of K-32 Truck (Front Street). K-32 heads northeast along Front Street, parallel with a BNSF Railway track. The highway transitions to four lanes then reaches a partial cloverleaf interchange with K-7. The roadway curves more east and begins to parallel Mission Creek then enters Edwardsville south of the Lake of the Forest. In Edwardsville, it picks up the name of Kaw Drive. K-32 intersects North 4th Street (former K-107) then crosses Beits Creek.

K-32 continues through the city to a partial cloverleaf interchange with I-435 on the Edwardsville–Kansas City line. The highway curves more northeast and passes through the southwest portion of Kansas City before reaching an interchange with the Turner Diagonal. Here, K-32 turns southeast and crosses the Kansas River. The highway intersects South 55th Street then continues east along the north edge of the BNSF Railway yard. K-32 reaches a partial cloverleaf interchange with I-635 as it enters a heavy industrial area. East of I-635, K-32 crosses the Kansas River again before reaching its eastern terminus at a partial cloverleaf interchange with US-69, also known as the 18th Street Expressway. Past US-69, the highway continues as Kansas Avenue.

The entire length of K-32 is known as the Kaw Valley Scenic Highway. The Kansas Department of Transportation (KDOT) tracks the traffic levels on its highways. On K-32 in 2020, they determined that on average the traffic varied from 2,010 vehicles per day near the western terminus to 16,000 vehicles per day slightly east of I-635. The majority of K-32 is maintained by KDOT; the section in Bonner Springs from the west city limit to the southbound on-ramp for K-7 and the section in Kansas City from South 55th Street to US-69 are maintained by those municipalities. The section of K-32 from K-7 eastward is part of the National Highway System.

History
K-32 was first established as a state highway by the Kansas State Highway Commission (SHC), now known as KDOT, in 1927. At that time, the highway went from US-40 northeast of Lawrence and through Bonner Springs to the Missouri border in Kansas City, following Kansas Avenue through Kansas City. By 1937, K-32 was realigned to follow Muncie Bluff Road and Central Avenue through Kansas City. In a resolution passed on July 1, 1937, the SHC approved to designate the former section of K-32 along Kansas Avenue as K-132. In a resolution passed on May 8, 1945, it was approved to realign K-32's western terminus slightly northeastward, which eliminated a crossing over Mud Creek. Prior to this, the highway got covered with water every time Mud Creek flooded.

K-32 originally followed Golden Road west of Linwood. East of Linwood it continued east along Golden Road to 170th Street (County Route 3), where it turned north. It continued north to Hemphill Road, where it turned east. In a resolution approved on September 11, 1945, it was approved to realign K-32 to leave Linwood and travel directly northeast to Hemphill Road. Then in a resolution approved on January 10, 1952, that resolution was updated to include the section of K-32 from Linwood west to Golden Road. At the end of August 1952, the SHC asked for bids for grading and a bridge on the new location of K-32 from Linwood northeastward and bids for grading for a new location of K-32 from the Leavenworth-Douglas county line east to Linwood. On October 1, 1952, the SCH approved a $424,305 (equivalent to $ in  dollars) bid for the two sections. By the end of July 1953, grading work was nearly complete, with work remaining to be done on the bridge over Stranger Creek.

By 1957, the Kansas Turnpike (I-70) had been built through Kansas City, including an exit with K-32. By 1962, US-40 was realigned to follow the Turner Diagonal to K-32 then overlap the latter to I-70. Also, K-32's eastern terminus was extended to the Turnpike.

At the end of August 1967, the SHC asked for bids to add a pair of lanes to K-32 from 88th Street in Kansas City west to K-7 in Bonner Springs. In late September 1967, the SHC accepted bids for grading, pavement, seeding, and four bridges on the project, as well as drainage and surfacing work on K-7 at the interchange with K-32. The project was completed by 1969.

By 1969, the overlap between US-40 and I-70 was extended west to exit 415, which removed the overlap between K-32 and US-40. In the early 1970s, the entire length of K-32 was designated as the Kaw Valley Scenic Highway. By 1981, I-435 had been built from K-32 southward to just south of K-10. By 1984, I-435 had been extended north slightly past K-32. By 1993, K-132 was decommissioned, and K-32 was realigned to follow the section of the former highway east to US-69. By 2011, the exit with County Route 1 was built. This created a connection with I-70 and US-40 north of K-32.

Major intersections

Special routes

Truck route

K-32 Truck is a truck route of K-32 that serves Bonner Springs and bypasses the downtown area. Starting from K-32 west of the city, it begins traveling southeastward along Scheidt Lane. The roadway reaches an intersection with East Front Street, where it turns northeast. The highway reaches an at-grade crossing with a track as it begins to parallel the Kansas River. K-32 Truck proceeds to its eastern terminus at the intersection of Front and Cedar streets, with K-32 continuing east on Front Street. K-32. The truck route was approved on May 1, 2000, in a city council meeting, alongside an ordinance prohibiting trucks on Cedar Street and Kump Avenue.

Former temporary route

Temporary K-32 was a former temporary route for K-32 that ran along the former section of K-32 along Dan Wilson Road and Kansas Avenue in Kansas City. In a resolution passed on July 1, 1937, K-132 was approved to be established, replacing the entire length of Temporary K-32.

References

External links

Kansas Department of Transportation State Map
KDOT: Historic State Maps

032
Transportation in the Kansas City metropolitan area
Transportation in Douglas County, Kansas
Transportation in Wyandotte County, Kansas
Transportation in Leavenworth County, Kansas